Zapoteco de Valles, del noreste is a name used by INALI for a variety of Zapotec recognized by the Mexican government.  It corresponds to two ISO languages:

 Santo Domingo Albarradas Zapotec (ISO 639-3: zas)
 Santa Catarina Albarradas Zapotec (ISO 639-3: ztn)

See also
 Zapoteco